Evergreen is an unincorporated community in Ransom Township, Columbus County, North Carolina, United States, located approximately one mile south of Delco.  It lies at an elevation of 39 feet (12 m).

References

Unincorporated communities in North Carolina
Unincorporated communities in Columbus County, North Carolina